Lambda Rising was an LGBT bookstore that operated from 1974 to 2010 in Washington, D.C.

Founded by Deacon Maccubbin in 1974 with 250 titles, it was known for its wide selection of books, ranging from queer theory and religion to erotica, as well as DVDs, music CDs and gifts.

It moved to a  retail space at 2001 S Street NW in 1979 and, in 1984, moved to a  space at 1625 Connecticut Ave NW Connecticut Avenue in Dupont Circle, one of Washington's neighborhoods popular among the gay and lesbian community.

A second store in Baltimore, Maryland, believed by the Baltimore Sun to be the only gay bookstore in Maryland, opened in 1984 and closed in the spring of 2008. Film director John Waters declared that store's closing "very, very sad". Waters, a long-time customer, said the Baltimore shop was "a seriously good bookshop, with the added touch of porno...I always went in there to find books that I didn't know about and couldn't find anywhere else." A third store in Rehoboth Beach, Delaware opened in 1991 and closed in December 2009.

A fourth store in Norfolk, Virginia opened in 1996 and closed in June 2007.

In February 1975, Lambda Rising ran the world's first gay-oriented television commercial; it aired on WRC (owned]] by NBC) and WTOP (the local CBS affiliate, now WUSA). Also in 1975, Lambda Rising organized Gay Pride Day, the forerunner to Capital Pride, Washington's first annual gay pride celebration, and continued to host the event for the next four years and then turned it over to a non-profit organization.

To support LGBT literature, Lambda Rising created the Lambda Book Report in 1987 and the annual Lambda Literary Award, also known as "the Lammys", in 1989. In 1996, Lambda Rising turned those projects over to the new non-profit Lambda Literary Foundation.

In February 2003, Lambda Rising bought the Oscar Wilde Bookshop, the country's first gay and lesbian bookstore, to prevent it from closing. The store was founded by Craig Rodwell in 1967 at 291 Mercer Street in Greenwich Village, later moving to 15 Christopher Street, opposite Gay Street in Manhattan. After working with the New York City staff for three years and getting the store on solid financial footing, Lambda Rising sold the store to the long-time manager in order to return the store to local control.

In December 2009, Maccubbin announced that Lambda Rising's two stores would close by January 2010. In his statement, Maccubbin said

Facing competition with online book stores, the store closed its doors on December 31, 2010. It was part of a spate of LGBT brick and mortar bookstores closures in the early 21st century, including the Oscar Wilde Bookshop in New York and A Different Light in Los Angeles and San Francisco.

References

External links

 Lambda Literary Foundation, sponsor of the annual Lambda Literary Awards
 "Places in Our History: 1724 20th St NW - The Community Building", by the Rainbow History Project

Independent bookstores of the United States
Buildings and structures in Washington, D.C.
Dupont Circle
LGBT bookstores
LGBT culture in Washington, D.C.
LGBT history in the United States
Bookstores established in the 20th century
American companies established in 1974
Retail companies established in 1974
Retail companies disestablished in 2010
1974 establishments in Washington, D.C.
2010 disestablishments in Washington, D.C.
Defunct companies based in Washington, D.C.
Defunct retail companies of the United States